Yết Kiêu (pennant number 927) is a multipurpose submarine search-and-rescue ship (MSSARS) of the Vietnam People's Navy. The ship is stationed at the Vietnamese Cam Ranh Naval Base, and it is purposed to support the operation of VPN's fleet of six  diesel-electric attack submarines which were formally acquired in 2009 and firstly commissioned in early 2014.

Launching and design 
Designated as MSSARS 9316, the concept of Yết Kiêu was first revealed in early 2018 during the Vietship 2018 Exhibition in Hanoi and confirmed to be built by the state-owned Z189 Shipyard, using the design, technology and accessories supplied by Damen Group. MSSARS 9316 design was confirmed as slightly bigger than its sister ships, MV Stoker and MV Besant, which were also designed by Damen and built by Z189 for the Australian DMS Maritime, when Yết Kiêu has slightly bigger length, and it also has a slightly higher displacement and deck area.

A keel-laying ceremony for MSSARS 9316 was held in Z189 Shipyard in the city of Haiphong on May 24, 2018.

Aside from its main role as a submarine rescue vessel, MSSARS 9316 will also be capable of conducting underwater surveying, seafloor mapping, and will serve as an ocean research vessel, said the report, adding that the construction of the ship is expected to take 27 months. However, it took only 17 months to build the ship, and it was introduced by the first time to the public in December 2019, marking the first time Vietnam owns a vessel which is dedicated for submarine rescue mission.

Commission and operation 

Initially, Yết Kiêu was expected to be fully operational before the scheduled Vietnamese-hosted International Maritime Review at Nha Trang in May 2020. As requested by naval chief Vice Admiral Phạm Hoài Nam, it will participate in IMR 2020 with the rest of the Vietnam People's Navy fleet alongside visiting ships from the ASEAN countries and other nations. However, due to the impact of the COVID-19 pandemic, the event was never held and the commission of the ship was also silently delayed.

In June 2021, the submarine rescue vehicle (SRV) for the ship was first time revealed, hinting that the vessel is now closer to its commission.

On July 30, 2021, at the Z189 Shipyard, the ship was formally commissioned into the Vietnam People's Navy.

In August 2021, a Kamov Ka-32T utility helicopter of the 954th Brigade, Vietnamese Naval Air Force landed on the ship's helipad for the very first time as a part of the acceptance progress. After the progress, the helipad and other equipment of the ship were confirmed meeting the technical requirements of the Navy and the manufacturers, being the basis for the training and implementing the missions of the ships in the near future.

Equipments 
Yết Kiêu is featured with a number of a number of high-tech equipment and vehicles to support its designated mission of searching and rescuing submersible vehicles:

See also 

 MV Besant
 MV Stoker
 Trần Đại Nghĩa (HQ-888)
 Đinh Tiên Hoàng (HQ-011)
 Lý Thái Tổ (HQ-012)
 Hà Nội (HQ-182)
 Hồ Chí Minh City (HQ-183)
 Hải Phòng (HQ-184)
 Khánh Hòa (HQ-185)
 Đà Nẵng (HQ-186)
 Bà Rịa - Vũng Tàu (HQ-187)

Reference and sources 

Ships of the Vietnam People's Navy